José Asconeguy (born 14 May 1963) is a Uruguayan former cyclist. He competed in the road race at the 1988 Summer Olympics.

References

1963 births
Living people
Uruguayan male cyclists
Olympic cyclists of Uruguay
Cyclists at the 1988 Summer Olympics
People from Trinidad, Uruguay